Waitpinga is a locality in the Australian state of South Australia located about  south of the state capital of Adelaide and about  southwest of the municipal seat of Victor Harbor.

The name is of Aboriginal origin, meaning home of the winds.

Waitpinga's coastline includes the following beaches popular for activities such as fishing and surfing - Coolawang, King Head, Parsons Beach and Waitpinga. Waitpinga Beach is a popular surfing and fishing beach, good for salmon and mullet and characterized by its reddish sand.  It is an exposed beach that has a consistent surf and the best surfing this close to Adelaide.  It is also one of the most dangerous beaches for surfers or swimmers without experience in rough conditions. Swimmers can easily become trapped in rips and rough seas and there is no life saving service at this beach. There are rough waves, powerful rips and sharks who come to feed on the salmon and mullet.

Waitpinga is located within the federal division of Mayo, the state electoral district of Finniss and the local government areas of the City of Victor Harbor and the District Council of Yankalilla.

See also
List of cities and towns in South Australia
Newland Head Conservation Park

References

Towns in South Australia